Nanny Wermuth (born 4 December 1943) is the Professor emerita of Statistics, Chalmers University of Technology/University of Gothenburg. Her research interests are Multivariate statistical models and their properties, especially graphical Markov models, as well as their applications in the life sciences and in the natural sciences.

Academic career

Education
1967 First degree in Economics (Diplom-Volkswirtin), University of Munich
1972 Degree in Statistics (Doctor of Philosophy), Harvard University
1977 Degree in Medical Statistics (Professor), University of Mainz

Professional positions
1972–1978 Research Assistant in Statistics; University of Dortmund, University of Mainz
since 1978 Professor of Statistics and of Methods in Psychology, University of Mainz
1997–2000 Head of Research and Development, Center of Survey Research, Mannheim
since 2003 Professor of Statistics, Department of Mathematical Sciences at Chalmers University of Technology and University of Gothenburg

Selected services to the profession
1993–2001 Coordinating member of the European Science Foundation network HSSS
1993–2003 Editorial Advisor for the Springer Series of Statistics
1995–1996 President, German Region of the International Biometric Society
2000–2001 President, International Biometric Society
2001–2004 Chair of the Life Science Committee of the International Statistical Institute
2008–2009 President, Institute of Mathematical Statistics
2007–2010 Associate Editor of Bernoulli

Selected recognitions
1968–1972 Stipends of the Fulbright Commission, of the International Peace Scholarship Fund and of Harvard University
1984–1985 Fulbright Scholar, Department of Statistics, Princeton University
1992 Max Planck-Research Prize, jointly with Sir David Cox, Oxford
2001 Short term Research Fellowship, Australian National University
2001–2002 Invited Research Fellow at Harvard’s Radcliffe Institute for Advanced Study
2011–2012 Senior Scientist Research Award, International Agency for Research on Cancer

Professional affiliations
She was elected as member of the International Statistical Institute (1982) and of the German Academy of Sciences (2002); as fellow of the American Statistical Association (1989) and of the Institute of Mathematical Statistics (2001).

Personal life
She has four sons with Dr. Dieter Wermuth - Jochen (1969) Martin (1974), Peter (1976) and Ulli (1981)

References

External links
 Academic website at Chalmers/University of Gothenburg
 entry at Mathematics Genealogy Project

1943 births
Living people
Presidents of the Institute of Mathematical Statistics
Swedish statisticians
Harvard Graduate School of Arts and Sciences alumni
Elected Members of the International Statistical Institute
Fellows of the American Statistical Association
Fellows of the Institute of Mathematical Statistics
Ludwig Maximilian University of Munich
Johannes Gutenberg University Mainz alumni
Women statisticians
Mathematical statisticians